Eyedrum Art & Music Gallery is a non-profit art space and venue in Atlanta, Georgia, founded by American painter Woody Cornwell and musician and journalist Marshall Avett in 1998, and focused on contemporary art and experimental music ranging from contemporary chamber music and sound sculpture to drone noise music and art rock. Until January 1, 2011, the organization was located in the Old Fourth Ward district, and had three art gallery spaces and one space for music and performance. It hosted approximately 180 events yearly. Established in 1998, Eyedrum is one of the longest-running art and performance spaces in Atlanta managed by volunteers.

References

External links
official website

Music venues in Atlanta
Arts organizations based in Georgia (U.S. state)
Arts organizations established in 1998
1998 establishments in Georgia (U.S. state)